Chamarajanagar Assembly constituency is one of the seats in Karnataka Legislative Assembly in India. It is part of Chamarajanagar Lok Sabha seat.

Members of Assembly 
 1967 : S. Puttaswamy (IND)

Election Results

1967 Assembly Election
 S. Puttaswamy (IND) : 17,948 votes    
 M.C. Basappa (INC) : 16686

2018 Assembly Election
 C Puttarangashetty (INC) : 75,963 votes  
 K R Mallikarjunappa (BJP) : 71050

See also 
 List of constituencies of Karnataka Legislative Assembly

References 

Assembly constituencies of Karnataka